The Nicolas Appert Award is awarded by the Chicago Section of the Institute of Food Technologists for preeminence in and contributions to the field of food technology. The award has been given annually since 1942 and is named after Nicolas Appert, the French inventor of airtight food preservation. Award winners receive a bronze medal with a front view of Appert and a $5000 honorarium. This is considered one of the highest honors in food technology.

Winners
Source: IFT

References

Food technology awards